Yandyganovo (Yanduğan) is a rural locality (a village) in Akbulatovsky Selsoviet, Mishkinsky District, Bashkortostan, Russia. The population was 391 as of 2010. There are 7 streets.

Geography 
Yandyganovo is located 14 km south of Mishkino (the district's administrative centre) by road. Kochkildino is the nearest rural locality.

References 

Rural localities in Mishkinsky District